The C&C 110, originally called the 110 Express at introduction, is an American sailboat, that was designed by Tim Jackett and entered production in 1999.

Production
The boat was built by C&C Yachts in the United States, starting in 1999, but it is now out of production.

Design
The C&C 110 is a small recreational keelboat, built predominantly of fiberglass. It has a masthead sloop rig, an internally-mounted spade-type rudder and a fixed fin keel. It displaces  and carries  of lead ballast.

The first examples built were made with vinylester resin, but in 2002, this was changed to a post cure epoxy to reduce weight. The rudder section was also altered to give better control in higher winds.

The initial standard rig was made by Offshore Spars and was configured with triple spreaders and rod rigging. This was later changed a double spreader rig with wire rigging made by Seldén Mast AB of Sweden, but the Offshore Spars triple spreader rig remained optional. The standard rig was changed to a carbon fiber one in 2004.

A  bowsprit was also a factory option.

The design had a choice of keels.

The boat was fitted with an inboard engine.

The boat has a PHRF racing average handicap of 81 with a high of 93 and low of 75.

See also
List of sailing boat types

Similar sailboats
Alberg 37
Baltic 37
Beneteau 361
C&C 36-1
C&C 36R
C&C 37
Catalina 36
Dickerson 37
Dockrell 37
Ericson 36
Express 37
Frigate 36
Hunter 36
Hunter 36-2
Hunter 36 Legend
Hunter 36 Vision
Invader 36
Islander 36
Marlow-Hunter 37
Nonsuch 36
Nor'Sea 37

References

Keelboats
1990s sailboat type designs
Sailing yachts
Sailboat type designs by Tim Jackett
Sailboat types built by C&C Yachts